The American League Championship Series (ALCS), also known as the American League Pennant, is a best-of-seven playoff and one of two League Championship Series comprising the penultimate round of Major League Baseball's (MLB) postseason. It is contested by the two winners of the American League (AL) Division Series. The winner of the ALCS wins the AL pennant and advances to the World Series, MLB's championship series, to play the winner of the National League's (NL) Championship Series. The ALCS began in 1969 as a best-of-five playoff and used this format until 1985, when it changed to its current best-of-seven format.

History
Prior to 1969, the American League champion (the "pennant winner") was determined by the best win–loss record at the end of the regular season.

The ALCS started in 1969, when the AL reorganized into two divisions, East and West. The winners of each division played each other in a best-of-five series to determine who would advance to the World Series. In 1985, the format changed to best-of-seven. 

In 1981, a division series was held due to a split season caused by a players' strike. 

In 1994, the league was restructured into three divisions, with the three division winners and a Wild Card team advancing to a best-of-five postseason round, known as the American League Division Series (ALDS). The winners of that round then advanced to the best-of-seven ALCS. The playoffs were expanded in 2012 to include a second Wild Card team and in 2022 to include a third Wild Card team.

The ALCS and NLCS, since the expansion to best-of-seven, are always played in a 2–3–2 format: Games 1, 2, 6, and 7 are played in the stadium of the team that has home field advantage, and Games 3, 4, and 5 are played in the stadium of the team that does not. The series concludes when one team records its fourth win. Since 1998, home field advantage has been given to the team that has the better regular season record, except a division champion would always get home advantage over a Wild Card team. If both teams have identical records in the regular season, then home field advantage goes to the team that has the winning head-to-head record. From 1969 to 1993, home-field advantage alternated between the two divisions, and from 1995 to 1997 home-field advantage was determined before the season.

Eight managers have led a team to the ALCS in three consecutive seasons; however, the most consecutive ALCS appearances by one manager is Joe Torre, who led the New York Yankees to four straight from 1998 to 2001. The Houston Astros (2017-present) are the only team in the American League to have made six consecutive American League Championship Series appearances.

The Milwaukee Brewers, an American League team between 1969 and 1997, and the Houston Astros, a National League team between 1962 and 2012, are the only franchises to play in both the ALCS and NLCS. The Astros are the only team to have won both an NLCS (2005) and an ALCS (2017, 2019, 2021, and 2022). Every current American League franchise has appeared in the ALCS.

Championship Trophy
The William Harridge Trophy is awarded to the ALCS champion. Will Harridge served as American League president from 1931 to 1959.

Most Valuable Player Award
See: League Championship Series Most Valuable Player Award#American League winners
The Lee MacPhail Most Valuable Player (MVP) award is given to the outstanding player in the ALCS. No MVP award is given for Division Series play.

Although the National League began its LCS MVP award in 1977, the American League did not begin its LCS MVP award till 1980. The winners are listed in several locations:
 in the below ALCS results table, in the "Series MVP" column
 in the article League Championship Series Most Valuable Player Award
 on the MLB website

Results

Appearances by team

Years of appearance
In the sortable table below, teams are ordered first by number of wins, then by number of appearances, and finally by year of first appearance. In the "Season(s)" column, bold years indicate winning appearances.

Recurring matchups

See also

List of American League pennant winners
List of American League Wild Card winners
American League Division Series
National League Championship Series

Notes

References

External links
 League Championship Series History at Baseball Almanac
 World Series and MLB Playoffs at Baseball-Reference.com
 Post-Season Games Directory at Retrosheet

 
Recurring sporting events established in 1969
Annual events in Major League Baseball